Siareiras Galegos (or Siareir@s Galeg@s) is a group of fans of the Galician national football team, born in the mid-1990s.

History 

Siareiras Galegas began in December 2005, with the resurrection of the Galician football team at a match against Uruguay after 69 years of prohibition. It was generally viewed as a success by Galician supporters. Siareiras Galegas held a great demonstration supporting the officiality of the Galician national team, attended by at least 2,000 people all around the streets of A Coruña. This became a kind of tradition, and every year the collective holds demonstrations coinciding with every match of the Galician national team. It is conformed by hundreds of supporters, and participates actively in political movements sometimes.

Performance 
Their football songs usually have a strong political charge, as they are officially Galician nationalists. Galician bagpipes and percussion usually go with them, as they show flags of Galicia, flags of the Kingdom of Galicia and coats of the Galician kings. They have taken to the stadiums flags of the Celtic nations or simply Scottish and Irish flags, considering these as friendly countries.

Matches organized by Siareiros Galegos

References

External links
Official website (in Galician)

Football in Galicia (Spain)